Chatham is a railway station in Chatham, New Jersey. A commuter rail station, Chatham receives rail service from statewide provider NJ Transit on its Morristown Line, a branch of the Morris & Essex Lines. Trains on the Morristown Line go to both Hoboken Terminal and New York Penn Station.

History
Chatham station opened on September 28, 1837 along with other stations on the Morris and Essex Railroad between Orange (at one time the western terminus of the line) and Morristown. During the beginnings of the rail in the area, Chatham was the home of a relatively well-utilised and large rail yard because of the steep grades in the surrounding area. In the early 1900s, the station was mainly used by vacationers from New York City who came to Chatham to experience what was then considered a beautiful town away from the bustling city. A number of hotels on Main Street served this vacation interest.

A new elevated station was built in 1914 with a tunnel connecting the two platforms. The station was located at Fairmount Avenue, one block from Main Street. Distinctive weeping Mulberry trees were planted to enhance the station and the area of its two plazas. The railroad razed the old station in August 1914.

The presence of a train station in Chatham Borough would later prove a vital role in population increases following World War II in adjacent Chatham Township, when rural lands in the township began to be developed for residential use, because of the easy commute to Manhattan.

In 1929, the Delaware, Lackawanna and Western Railroad, the owners of the railway at the time, spent $100 million to electrify the Morris & Essex lines. This meant that Chatham station would be electrified and would be served by electric trains, some of the first in the United States. During summer 2007, operator New Jersey Transit replaced the tracks at Chatham along with those on the rest of the Morristown Line, upgrading them to have more advanced and reliable concrete ties rather than older wooden types. The exterior of the station recently went under renovation. Some of the renovations the station received included a new paint job and a new roof.

Station layout and service
Chatham is located on New Jersey Transit's Morristown Line of the Morris & Essex Lines. The station receives traffic bound for and coming from both of New Jersey Transit's main terminals: Hoboken Terminal and New York Penn Station. Trains bound eastward toward these two nodes arrive in an alternating fashion at Chatham, so that a Hoboken bound train will be followed by a New York bound train. Service is relatively frequent, with morning rush hour trains arriving at intervals of as little as six minutes. During off-peak hours, trains heading toward each node come at hourly gaps, meaning a train arrives at Chatham almost every thirty minutes during non-rush hour times. This amount of service is only comparable to that of the Northeast Corridor Line.

Bibliography

References

External links

Railway stations in the United States opened in 1837
NJ Transit Rail Operations stations
Former Delaware, Lackawanna and Western Railroad stations
1837 establishments in New Jersey